Lawrence O'Connor may refer to:
Larry O'Connor (radio host) (born 1967), American radio host
Larry O'Connor (ice hockey) (born 1950), Canadian ice hockey player
Larry O'Connor (politician) (born 1956), Canadian politician
Larry O'Connor (athlete) (1916–1995), Canadian Olympic athlete
Lawrence J. O'Connor (died 1900), American architect
Lawrence O'Connor (rapist) (died 1964), criminal executed by the state of Texas in 1964